The 2010 South American Rhythmic Gymnastics Championships were held in Cochabamba, Bolivia, November 18–23, 2010. The competition was organized by the Bolivian Gymnastics Federation and approved by the International Gymnastics Federation.

Medalists

References 

2010 in gymnastics
Rhythmic Gymnastics,2010
International gymnastics competitions hosted by Bolivia
2010 in Bolivian sport